Blánaid Salkeld (born Florence Ffrench Mullen; 1880 – 1959) was an Irish poet, dramatist, actor, and publisher, whose well-known literary salon was attended by, among others, Patrick Kavanagh and Flann O'Brien.

Early life and family
Salkeld was born Florence Ffrench Mullen in Chittagong on 10 August 1880, and grew up in Dublin on Fitzwilliam Street. Her father,  Lt Colonel Jarlath ffrench-Mullen, a doctor in the Indian Medical Service, was a friend of Rabindranath Tagore and also introduced her to the poetry of Keats. She had at least one brother, Padraic. She married Henry Salkeld in 1902 and spent the next six years in India with her husband, who worked in the Indian Civil Service, living in Dacca and Bombay. She returned to Dublin with her son Cecil, in 1910 following the death of her husband in 1909. Though some accounts have Salkeld back in Dublin as early as 1906.

Career
In Dublin, she joined the Abbey Players as an actor, using the Irish form of her name, Blánaid (then spelled Blathnaid) and the stage name Nell Byrne. She played the lead role in George Fitzmaurice's three-act play The Country Dressmaker. She started writing verse plays in the 1930s, and one of these, Scarecrow Over the Corn, was staged in 1941 at the Gate Theatre with stage sets designed by Louis le Brocquy. Salkeld contributed numerous book reviews to The Dublin Magazine, Irish Writing, and The Bell. She translated Akhmatova, Bruisov, Blok, and Pushkin from the Russian into English. The salons she hosted in her home were frequented by Kate O'Brien, Arland Ussher, Patrick Kavanagh, Flann O'Brien, and Micheál Mac Liammóir. Her first volume of poetry, Hello Eternity, was praised by Samuel Beckett. She founded the Irish Women's Writers' Club with Dorothy Macardle in 1933.

She co-founded the Gayfield Press with her son, Cecil, in 1937. It operated from the garden shed at their home at 43 Morehampton Road until 1946. The press was a small Adana wooden hand press. The Salkelds later loaned the press to Liam and Josephine Miller in 1951, with which they founded the Dolmen Press.

During the preparations for the Easter Rising, a room on the first floor of 130 St Stephen's Green which she had lent to Thomas MacDonagh was his headquarters.

Salkeld died in Dublin in 1959. Her granddaughter Beatrice married Brendan Behan. Her work is considered overlooked within the canon of early 20th century Irish poetry, as it was neither of the Celtic revival or modernist.

Poetry
Salkeld published five books of poetry:

 Hello, Eternity (Elkin Mathews 1933)
 A Dubliner (Dublin: Gayfield 1942)
 The Fox’s Covert (JM Dent 1935)
 The engine is left running (Gayfield 1937)
 Experiment In Error (Aldington, Kent: Hand & Flower Press 1955)

References

External links
 Blánaid Salkeld at Ricorso
 
 Picture of Salkeld with the Irish Womens' Writers Club in 1938 held by the UCD Archives

1880 births
1959 deaths
Irish modernist poets
Modernist women writers
People from Chittagong
Irish women poets
20th-century Irish poets
20th-century Irish women writers
European salon-holders
Irish people in colonial India